Tarbela Dam is an earth-filled dam along the Indus River in Pakistan's Khyber Pakhtunkhwa province. It is the largest earth-filled dam in the world.

The Tarbela Dam is built on the Indus at Bara near the village of Tarbela. It is about 30 km from the town of Attock. When the Indus leaves the Himalayans foothills and enters the Potwar pleateau, the water is stored in the reservoir of the dam. It is 143 meters high, has an area of 243 square km, storage capacity of 119 billion cubic meters of water and has nine gates to control the outflow of water. The dam was completed in 1976 and was designed to utilize water from the Indus River for irrigation, flood control, and the generation of hydroelectric power by storing flows during the monsoon period and subsequently releasing stored water during the low flow period in winter. The installed capacity of the 4,888 MW Tarbela hydroelectric power stations will increase to 6,298 MW after completion of the planned fifth extension financed by Asian Infrastructure Investment Bank and the World Bank.

Project description

The dam is at a narrow spot in the Indus River valley, named after the town of Tarbela in the Haripur District of Hazara Division, Pakistan.

A pair of concrete auxiliary dams spans the river from the island to river left. The dam's two spillways are on the auxiliary dams rather than the main dam. Annually, over 70% of water discharged at Tarbela passes over the spillways and is not used for hydropower generation.

Five large tunnels were constructed as part of the outlet works. Hydroelectricity is generated from turbines in tunnel 1 through 3, while tunnels 4 and 5 were designed for irrigation use. Both tunnels are to be converted to hydropower tunnels to increase Tarbela's electricity-generating capacity. These tunnels were originally used to divert the Indus River while the dam was being constructed.

MA hydroelectric power plant on the right side of the main dam houses 14 generators fed with water from outlet tunnels 1, 2, and 3. There are four 175 MW generators on tunnel 1, six 175 MW generators on tunnel 2, and four 432 MW generators on tunnel 3, for a total generating capacity of 3,478 MW.

There are two main Indus River tributaries upstream of the Tarbela Dam. These are the Shyok River, joining near Skardu, and the Siran River near Tarbela.

Background
Tarbela Dam was constructed as part of the Indus Basin Project after signing of the 1960 Indus Waters Treaty between India and Pakistan. The purpose was to compensate for the loss of water supplies of the eastern rivers (Ravi, Sutlej and Beas) that were designated for exclusive use by India per terms of the treaty. By the mid-1970s, power generation capacity was added in three subsequent hydro-electrical project extensions which were completed in 1992, installing a total of 3,478 MW generating capacity.

Construction

Construction of Tarbela Dam was carried out in three stages to meet the diversion requirements of the river. Construction was undertaken by the Italian firm Salini Impregilo.

Stage 1
Stage 1 construction lasted approximately 2.5 years.

Stage 2
The main embankment dam and the upstream blanket were constructed across the main valley of the river Indus as part of the second stage of construction. During this time, water from the Indus river remained diverted through the diversion channel. By the end of construction works in stage 2, tunnels had been built for diversion purposes. Stage 2 construction took 3 years to complete.

Stage 3
Under the third stage of construction, works were carried out on the closure of diversion channel and construction of the dam in that portion while the river was made to flow through diversion tunnels. The remaining portion of upstream blanket and the main dam at higher levels was also completed as part of stage 3 works, which were concluded in 1976.

Re-settlement of people affected by Tarbela Dam

The large reservoir of the dam submerged 135 villages, which resulted in displacement of a population of about 96,000 people, many of whom were relocated to townships surrounding the Tarbela Reservoir or in adjacent higher valleys.

For the land and built-up property acquired under the Land Acquisition Act of 1984, a cash compensation of Rs 469.65 million was paid to those affected. In the absence of a national policy, the resettlement concerns of the people displaced by the Tarbela Dam were addressed on an ad hoc basis. In 2011, many such people had still not been resettled or given land in compensation for their losses by the government of Pakistan, in accordance with its contractual obligations with the World Bank.

Lifespan

Because the source of the Indus River is glacial meltwater from the Himalayas, the river carries huge amounts of sediment, with an annual suspended sediment load of 200 million tons. Live storage capacity of Tarbela reservoir had declined more than 33.5 per cent to 6.434 million acre feet (MAF) against its original capacity of 9.679 MAF because of sedimentation over the past 38 years. The useful life of the dam and reservoir was estimated to be approximately 50 years. However, sedimentation has been much lower than predicted, and it is now estimated that the useful lifespan of the dam will be 85 years, to about 2060.

Pakistan plans to construct several large dams upstream of Tarbela, including the Diamer-Bhasha Dam. Upon completion of the Diamer-Bhasha dam, sediment loads into Tarbela will be decreased by 69%.

Project benefits

In addition to fulfilling the primary purpose of the dam, i.e., supplying water for irrigation, Tarbela Power Station has generated 341.139 billion kWh of hydro-electric energy since commissioning. A record annual generation of 16.463 billion kWh was recorded during 1998–99. Annual generation during 2007–08 was 14.959 billion kWh while the station shared peak load of 3702 MW during the year, which was 23.057% of total WAPDA system peak.

Tarbela-IV Extension Project
Tarbela dam extension-IV was planned in June, 2012, and PC-1 was developed for the project. US ambassador Richard Olson offered aid for construction of this project during his visit to Pakistan, in March, 2013. In September 2013, Pakistan's Water and Power Development Authority signed a Rs. 26.053 billion contract with Chinese firm Sinohydro and Germany's Voith Hydro for executing civil works on the 1,410 MW Tarbela-IV Extension Project. Construction commenced in February 2014, and was completed in February 2018.

This project was constructed on Tunnel No. 4 of Tarbela Dam. It consists of three turbine-generator units, each with a capacity of 470 MW. The project is expected to provide an average of 3.84 billion units of electricity annually to the National Grid. It is intended to help supplement electricity supply during the high-demand summer months.

Annual benefits of the project were estimated at Rs. 30.7 billion. On an annual basis, over 70% of water passing through Tarbela is discharged over spillways, while only a portion of the remaining 30% is used for hydropower generation.

The Water and Power Development Authority in Pakistan says the third and last unit at its 1,410-MW Tarbela 4th Extension Hydropower Project has been synchronized with the National Grid. With this extension, the installed capacity of the Tarbela Hydel Power Station has increased to 4,888 MW.

Financing

The project's cost was initially estimated to be $928 million, but the cost was revised downwards to $651 million. The World Bank had agreed to provide an $840 million loan for the project in June 2013.

The loan had two components: The first is a $400 million International Development Association loan, which will be lent as a concessional loan at low interest rates. The second portion consists of a $440 million from the World Bank's International Bank for Reconstruction and Development. Pakistan's Water and Power Development Authority was to provide the remaining $74 million required for construction, before the project's cost was downwardly revised by $277 million. Interest costs for the loans are estimated to cost $83.5 million.

Because of revised lower costs to $651 million from $928 million, the World Bank permitted Pakistani officials to expedite completion of the project by 8 months at a cost of an additional $51 million. Pakistani officials were also permitted to divert $126 million towards the Tarbela-V Extension Project.

Tarbela-V Extension Project
The Tarbela Dam was built with five original tunnels, with the first three dedicated to hydropower generation, and the remaining two slated for irrigation use. The fourth phase extension project uses the first of the two irrigation tunnels, while the fifth phase extension will use the second irrigation tunnel. Pakistan's Water and Power Development Authority sought expressions of interest for the Tarbela-V Extension Project in August 2014, and was given final consent for construction in September 2015.

Construction is yet to begin in July 2021 but will require an estimated 3.5 years for completion. The project will require installation of three turbines with a capacity of 470 MW each in Tarbela's fifth tunnel which was previously dedicated to agricultural use. Upon completion, the total power generating capacity of Tarbela Dam will be increased to 6,298 MW.

The hydro power project of tunnel 5 has two major components: power generation facilities and power evacuation facilities. The major works included under the project are modifications to tunnel 5 and building a new power house and its ancillaries to generate about 1,800GWh of power annually, a new 50 km of 500kV double-circuit transmission line from Tarbela to the Islamabad West Grid Station for power evacuation, and a new 500kV Islamabad West Grid Station.

Financing
In November 2015, the World Bank affirmed that it would finance at least $326 million of the project's estimated $796 million cost which includes $126 million of funding that was diverted from the $840 million fourth phase extension project after costs for that project were revised downwards. In September 2016, the World Bank approved an additional financing of $390 million for the fifth extension hydropower project of Tarbela dam that will support the scaling up of the power generation capacity by adding 1,410 megawatts to the existing tunnel 5.

The project will be financed by the International Bank for Reconstruction and Development (IBRD), with a variable spread and 20-year maturity, including a six-year grace period. This will be the first World Bank-supported project in South Asia to be jointly financed with the Asian Infrastructure Investment Bank (AIIB) which will be providing $300m and the Government of Pakistan $133.5m. The total cost of the project is $823.5m.

See also

 List of dams and reservoirs in Pakistan
 List of barrages and headworks in Pakistan
 List of power stations in Pakistan
 Satpara Dam
 Allai Khwar Hydropower Project
 Gomal Zam Dam
Katzarah Dam

External links

A trip to Tarbela Dam by Shaikh Muhammad Ali

Notes

Dams in Pakistan
Swabi District
Haripur District
Hydroelectric power stations in Pakistan
Geography of Khyber Pakhtunkhwa
Dams completed in 1974
Dams on the Indus River
Earth-filled dams
Dams in Khyber Pakhtunkhwa